Ever Since may refer to:

 "Ever Since" (song), a 2002 song by Sayaka
 Ever Since (Lesley Gore album), 2005
 Ever Since (Maestro album), 2000
 Eversince, a 2016 album by Bladee